Big Caliente Hot Springs are a grouping of thermal mineral springs located in the Los Padres National Forest of California.

Description
The temperature of the water can be controlled by adjusting diversion valves. Another primitive soaking pool is located below the spring source, adjacent to the creek. The water from these hot springs are rich in soda compounds.

Location
The springs are accessed via a  hike with many switchbacks. It is possible to drive to the site but it is not recommended as the gravel road tends to wash out and it becomes undrivable. A four-wheel drive vehicle or motorcycle is recommended for the drive up Romero Canyon.

Little Caliente
There are several primitive rock-lined soaking pools. From Big Caliente, head north at Juncal Campground. The GPS coordinates for Little Caliente hot spring are: . The spring fluctuates between muddy and clear depending on the season.

References

Hot springs of California
Los Padres National Forest